Felix is an unincorporated place and railway point in geographic Marshay Township in the Unorganized North Part of Sudbury District in Northeastern Ontario, Canada. The community is on Ningoowaswi Lake in the Wanapitei River system, part of the Great Lakes Basin.

Felix railway station is on the Canadian National Railway transcontinental main line, and is served by Via Rail Canadian trains. The next community eastbound is Appelo, but the next served community is McKee's Camp (served by McKee's Camp railway station) several communities further east; the next community westbound is Lapalmes, but the next served community is Ruel (served by Ruel railway station) one more community further west.

References

Other map sources:

Communities in Sudbury District